Joseph Clarke McInnes (9 December 1932 – 29 August 2021) was a Scottish footballer who played for Kilmarnock, Larkhall Thistle, Hamilton, Partick Thistle, Accrington Stanley, Third Lanark, Stirling Albion and Bangor. Coincidentally, both Accrington Stanley and Third Lanark were to go out of business soon after McInnes had left each club.

McInnes scored the goal for Third Lanark in the 1959 Scottish League Cup Final as they lost 2–1 to Hearts.

References

External links 

1932 births
2021 deaths
Association football wingers
Footballers from Glasgow
Scottish footballers
Kilmarnock F.C. players
Larkhall Thistle F.C. players
Hamilton Academical F.C. players
Partick Thistle F.C. players
Accrington Stanley F.C. (1891) players
Third Lanark A.C. players
Stirling Albion F.C. players
Bangor F.C. players
Scottish Junior Football Association players
Scottish Football League players
English Football League players